The Battle of Leobersdorf was a battle fought near Leobersdorf on 19 September 1532, as part of the Habsburg-Ottoman War (1526–1568).

The battle
After the failed Siege of Vienna in 1529, Sultan Suleiman gathered another massive army of 120,000 troops to besiege Vienna a second time in 1532. The small garrison of Koszeg consisting of 700 men led by Croatian Captain Nikola Jurišić blocked the way to Vienna for the main Ottoman army.

In the meantime, 8,000-16,000 Ottoman light cavalry, under Kazim Bey, raided Styria and bypassed Wiener Neustadt, and southern parts of  Lower Austria.

When Kazim Bey was informed of the retreat of the Ottoman main army, he gathered his raiders in Pottenstein to link up with the main army. Of the three possible valleys he could follow, two were blocked by abatis. An Austrian detachment under Sebastian Schertlin von Burtenbach managed to drive the Turks into the only remaining open valley, where a large army of 20,000 Landsknechts, 1,000 heavy cavalry, 1,000 light cavalry from Hungary, and artillery led by Palatinian Count Frederick, Count Bálint Török, and Johann Katzianer were waiting for them.

Kazim Bey's Ottoman army was completely destroyed,

References

See also
Leopold Kupelwieser,     Die Kämpfe Oesterreichs mit den Osmanen vom Jahre 1526 bis 1537, Wilhelm Braumuller, 1899.

Battles involving Hungary
Battles involving the Holy Roman Empire
Battles involving Austria
Battles involving the Ottoman Empire
Military history of Austria
1532 in Europe
Conflicts in 1532
1532 in the Ottoman Empire

de:Kasim Bey